Elşad Ahad Allahverdiyev (born 27 June 1973) is an Azerbaijani wrestler. He competed at the 1996 Summer Olympics and the 2000 Summer Olympics.

References

External links
 

1973 births
Living people
Azerbaijani male sport wrestlers
Olympic wrestlers of Azerbaijan
Wrestlers at the 1996 Summer Olympics
Wrestlers at the 2000 Summer Olympics
Place of birth missing (living people)
21st-century Azerbaijani people